Alessandro Garattoni (born 23 January 1998) is an Italian footballer who plays as a defender for  club Foggia.

Career
He made his Serie C debut for Imolese on 18 September 2018 in a game against AlbinoLeffe.

On 3 October 2020, he joined Juve Stabia.

On 30 July 2021, he signed a two-year contract with Foggia.

References

External links
 

1998 births
Living people
People from Cesena
Footballers from Emilia-Romagna
Italian footballers
Association football defenders
Serie C players
Serie D players
A.C. Cesena players
Imolese Calcio 1919 players
F.C. Crotone players
S.S. Juve Stabia players
Calcio Foggia 1920 players
Sportspeople from the Province of Forlì-Cesena